Gligoreşti may refer to several villages in Romania:

 Gligoreşti, a village in Vidra Commune, Alba County
 Gligoreşti, a village in Luna Commune, Cluj County